Barbazan can refer to:

 Arnaud Guillaume de Barbazan, counsellor to Charles VII of France
 Barbazan, Haute-Garonne, France